During the 2019 campaign Vålerenga will have competed in the following competitions: Eliteserien, Norwegian Football Cup.

Squad

Out on loan

Transfers

Winter

In:

Out:

Summer

In:

Out:

Friendlies

Competitions

Eliteserien

Results summary

Results by round

Results

Table

Norwegian Cup

Squad statistics

Appearances and goals

|-
|colspan="14"|Players away from Vålerenga on loan:

|-
|colspan="14"|Players who left Vålerenga during the season:

|}

Goal scorers

Disciplinary record

References

 Nome, Petter. Vi er Vål'enga. Oslo: Cappelen, 1997. .

External links
 Official pages
 Vålerenga Fotball På Nett – the biggest site for unofficial news and views
 Klanen, official Vålerenga supporters club

Vålerenga Fotball seasons
Valerenga